Trinidad (Spanish for "Trinity"; Yurok: Chuerey) is a seaside city in Humboldt County, located on the Pacific Ocean  north of the Arcata-Eureka Airport and  north of the college town of Arcata. Trinidad is noted for its coastline with ten public beaches and offshore rocks, part of the California Coastal National Monument, of which Trinidad is a Gateway City. Fishing operations related to Trinidad Harbor are vital to both local tourism and commercial fishery interests in the region.

History

Before 1700 AD, Yurok people established the village of Tsurai on bluffs overlooking Trinidad Bay.  The first European sighting of Trinidad Harbor was by the Manila galleon captain Sebastian Rodriguez Cermeño, who did not make landfall. The next visit was by Bruno de Heceta and Juan Francisco de la Bodega y Quadra
of the Spanish Navy. Their two ships anchored in Trinidad Bay on June 9, 1775. On 11 June, which was Trinity Sunday, a formal act of possession was conducted. At the place where a wooden cross was erected stands a carved stone cross bearing the inscription, "Carolus III Dei G. Hyspaniorum Rex" ("in the name of King Carlos of Spain").  The area was named "La Santisima Trinidad."

Settlers arrived on the James R. Whitting in 1850 and founded the town, renamed Warnersville in honor of R.V. Warner, one of the settlers. The first post office opened in Trinidad in 1851.

Trinidad was the original county seat of the eponymous Trinity County from 1850 to 1851, and of Klamath County, one of California's original counties, from 1851 to 1854. At that time Trinidad became part of the newly created Humboldt County after its creation in 1853, with its county seat in Eureka. Klamath County was finally dissolved in 1874.

During the American Civil War, from July to October 1863, California volunteers fighting the local Indians in the Bald Hills War were stationed in the town, in Trinidad Camp, to protect it and the coast road from Indian raids, until they were moved four miles north to Camp Gilmore. Trinidad was incorporated in 1870 as a City of the State of California, USA.

A whaling station owned by the California Sea Products Company operated in Trinidad from 1920 to 1926. 1140 whales were killed and processed in that time.

Trinidad resident Henry A. Boyes was a first sergeant with the 5th Marines in World War II; his service was described by Eugene Sledge in the book, With the Old Breed: At Peleliu and Okinawa.

Geography

Climate 
Trinidad has an oceanic climate, bordering on a warm-summer Mediterranean climate (csb) and is relatively temperate compared with inland areas. Spring and fall cold fronts often form advection fog which pushes the marine layer towards the coast. In summer, low pressure troughs produced by intense heating inland can create strong pressure gradients pulling the marine layer ashore. Summer fogs, moderate precipitation, and mild temperatures are characteristic of Northern California coastal forests ecoregion and are vital to the growth of local Coast Redwood.

Demographics

2010 Census data
The 2010 United States Census reported that Trinidad had a population of 367. The racial makeup of Trinidad was 331 (90.2%) White, 2 (0.5%) African American, 15 (4.1%) Native American, 2 (0.5%) Asian, 1 (0.3%) Pacific Islander, 1 (0.3%) from other races, and 15 (4.1%) from two or more races. Hispanic or Latino of any race were 11 persons (3.0%).

The Census reported that 366 people (99.7% of the population) lived in households, 1 (0.3%) lived in non-institutionalized group quarters, and 0 (0%) were institutionalized. There were 187 households, out of which 35 (18.7%) had children under the age of 18 living in them, 64 (34.2%) were opposite-sex married couples living together, 21 (11.2%) had a female householder with no husband present, 3 (1.6%) had a male householder with no wife present.  There were 20 (10.7%) unmarried opposite-sex partnerships, and 3 (1.6%) same-sex married couples or partnerships. 73 households (39.0%) were made up of individuals, and 28 (15.0%) had someone living alone who was 65 years of age or older. The average household size was 1.96.  There were 88 families (47.1% of all households); the average family size was 2.64.

The population dispersal was 60 people (16.3%) under the age of 18, 25 people (6.8%) aged 18 to 24, 91 people (24.8%) aged 25 to 44, 120 people (32.7%) aged 45 to 64, and 71 people (19.3%) who were 65 years of age or older. The median age was 45.9 years. For every 100 females, there were 98.4 males. For every 100 females age 18 and over, there were 98.1 males. The homeowner vacancy rate was 4.2%; the rental vacancy rate was 12.9%.  212 people (57.8% of the population) lived in owner-occupied housing units and 154 people (42.0%) lived in rental housing units.

2000 Census data
As of the census of 2000, there were 311 people, 168 households, and 73 families residing in the city. The racial makeup of the city was 94.86% White, 1.61% Black or African American, 0.32% Native American, 0.64% Asian, 0.32% Pacific Islander, 0.32% from other races, and 1.93% from two or more races.  2.25% of the population were Hispanic or Latino of any race. There were 168 households, out of which 12.5% had children under the age of 18 living with them, 36.9% were married couples living together, 5.4% had a female householder with no husband present, and 56.5% were non-families. 40.5% of all households were made up of individuals, and 11.9% had someone living alone who was 65 years of age or older. The average household size was 1.85 and the average family size was 2.51.

In the city, the population dispersal was 11.3% under the age of 18, 5.5% from 18 to 24, 21.9% from 25 to 44, 41.5% from 45 to 64, and 19.9% who were 65 years of age or older.  The median age was 50 years. For every 100 females, there were 98.1 males.  For every 100 females age 18 and over, there were 100.0 males. The median income for a household in the city was $40,000, and the median income for a family was $50,357. Males had a median income of $39,583 versus $31,167 for females. The per capita income for the city was $28,050.  About 2.3% of families and 8.8% of the population were below the poverty line, including 6.7% of those under age 18 and none of those age 65 or over.

Politics

Points of interest

State parks
Little River State Beach
Sue-meg State Park
Trinidad State Beach
Historic landmarks
Trinidad Head Light, National Registered Landmark #1720
Trinidad Head, State Historic Landmark #146
Town of Trinidad, State Historic Landmark #216
Old Indian Village of Tsurai, State Historic Landmark #838
Other
Trinidad Pier
Strawberry Rock
Fred Telonicher Marine Laboratory, Humboldt State University
Trinidad City Cemetery includes Indian and settler graves and one unusual tombstone.   Edward Bernhardt Schnaubelt was the brother of Rudolph Schnaubelt, accused of the Haymarket Riot bombing in Chicago, Illinois and the brother-in-law of Michael Schwab, sentenced to death for his role in the riot.  All three Schnaubelt brothers left Chicago shortly after the riot.  Edward Schnaubelt briefly panned for gold before settling in Trinidad, opening a sawmill and buying a tract of timber to supply his mill.  After Schnaubelt's mill was taken over by his rivals, he re-entered the closed mill at night to reclaim his personal tools, and was shot to death by a nightwatchman hired to protect the property. His wife chose the phrase "Murdered by Capitalism" for his marker which inspired the 2004 book by John Ross.

Events
Trinidad to Clam Beach Run (February)
Trinidad Fishermans Feast (October)
 Tour of Trinidad bicycle rides, 100k, 45k,20k (September) 
Blessing of the Fleet (November)

Notable residents
Robert Durst, real estate scion and suspected serial killer, former Trinidad homeowner
Michael John Fles, poet and musician
Victor Golla, linguist, expert on the indigenous languages of California and Oregon
Howard B. Keck, businessman
Tim McKay, environmental activist
Thomas Pynchon, author, lived in Trinidad during 197677
Don Van Vliet aka Captain Beefheart, musician and painter
Al Vermeer, cartoonist, creator of comic strip Priscilla's Pop

In popular culture
Part of the auto wreck scene in The Majestic was shot at College Cove Beach on 19 March  2001.

References

External links

Government and Public Community Information

Greater Trinidad Chamber of Commerce official website
Trinidad Tourism and Lodging Association official website - Stay in Trinidad!
California Coastal National Monument Gateway City of Trinidad official webpage
NOAA: local radar and weather

Individual and Private Community Information
Let's Explore Trinidad, California!
A Photographic History of Trinidad, California
Discover Trinidad, California!

1870 establishments in California
American Civil War army posts
California Historical Landmarks
Cities in Humboldt County, California
Former county seats in California
Incorporated cities and towns in California
Populated coastal places in California
Populated places established in 1850
1850 establishments in California
Settlements formerly in Klamath County, California
Port cities in California